The LG CU500 is a mobile phone manufactured by LG and was released in December 2006.  It was LG Group's first cell phone in the United States to include HSDPA capability, and also the first cell phone to work with Cingular's HSDPA network. The LG CU500v is a software upgrade to the LG CU500 which supports video calls.

Features
Technical Specifications:
 Network:	GSM 850 / 900 / 1800 / 1900 / HSDPA 850 / 1900 
 Form Factor:	Clamshell 
 Dimensions:	97 x 50 x 19 mm 
 Weight:	105 g 
 Antenna:	Internal 
 Navigation:	5-Way Keypad 
 Battery Type:	1100 mAh Li-Ion 
 Talk Time:	5.00 
 Standby Time:	240 
 Memory:	16.0 MB 
 Expandable Memory:	microSD / TransFlash
Imaging:
 Main Screen:	65000 colors (TFT)
 176 x 220 px
 External Screen:	65000 colors (TFT)
 96 x 96 px
 Camera:	1.3 MP / 1280 x 960 px / Rotate / 4X Zoom / Multi-Shot / Self-Timer / Video Recorder / Video Calling
Audio:
 MP3 Player:	MP3 / AAC / AAC+ / WMA / MusicID / 3D Stereo Sound
 FM Radio:	MobiRadio
 Speakerphone: Yes 
 Push-To-Talk: N/A
Multimedia:
 Wallpapers:	176 x 220 px
 Screen Savers:	176 x 220 px
 Ring Tones:	72 chord / MP3
 Themes:	 Yes
 Games:	Java ME
 Streaming Multimedia:	Cingular Video / MobiTV
Messaging:
 SMS:  Yes
 EMS: Yes
 MMS: Yes
 Email: AOL / Hotmail / Yahoo!
 Chat: AOL / ICQ / MSN / Yahoo!
 Predictive Text:	T9
Applications:
 Phonebook Capacity:	500
 Calendar: Yes
 To-Do List: Yes
 WAP:2.0
 Voice Commands: N/A
 Calculator: Yes
Connectivity:
 Bluetooth:	A2DP / DUN / HFP / HSP / OPP
 Infrared Port:	 N/A
 High-Speed Data: HSDPA
 Wi-Fi: N/A
 GPS: N/A
 PC Sync:	USB Mass Storage

Notes
 Used in NBC's hit show, The Office.
 The LG CU500 is capable of updating its firmware over the air. 
 Users must choose "allow" or "deny" every time a Java ME application accesses a data network.

Software update
The LG CU500v is a software upgrade to the CU500, adding video calling features supported by AT&T's high-speed HSDPA broadband network. Providing even faster rates than UMTS for streaming TV, radio, and online services, the video calling feature integrates in a rotating 1.3-megapixel camera to take clips or still photos at up to 1280 x 960 px in resolution. Consumers can listen to MP3s or MobiRadio through Bluetooth A2DP profile for stereo music without wires.

References

External links
 LG CU500 Product Page
  Guide to Hacking the CU500

Mobile phones introduced in 2006
CU500